Watercolour Challenge is a daytime television lifestyle game show that originally aired on Channel 4 from 15 June 1998 to 23 November 2001 and presented by Hannah Gordon. On 28 April 2021, it was announced that the show would be returning but on Channel 5 and presented by Fern Britton.

Format

In the programme, four amateur artists were given three hours to paint, in watercolour, the same scene or landscape, often with widely different interpretations. A programme was screened each day when at the end of each episode, the guest professional artist for the week judged the paintings and selected the winner, who would then appear in a regional final on Friday, and if successful would compete in the end of series final.

The expert artist also had a segment where they provided tips for the viewers to improve their painting technique.

The locations of each landscape painted changed in each episode, with various regions of both Great Britain and Ireland being visited, as well as a special show from Provence. The 2001 final was held in Tuscany.

Expert art judges included the artists Jason Bowyer, Mike Chaplin, Dorothy Dunnett, Annette Kane, Hazel Soan, and Jenny Wheatley. In 1999, Timmy Mallett was a regional judge for one episode of the show. A celebrity edition was produced, including Bill Oddie and Phillip Franks. The show was briefly presented by Cherie Lunghi, when Hannah Gordon was unable to do so due to illness.

In 2001, the programme won a Royal Television Society (RTS) award in the category of Best Features - Daytime.

Transmissions

Original

Revival

Books 
There have been two books written related to the television programme:

 Watercolour Challenge: A Complete Guide to Watercolour Painting, 2001, Diana Vowles, Channel 4 Books, 
 Watercolour Challenge: Practical Painting Course, 2002, Channel 4 Books,

References

External links
 
 

1998 British television series debuts
2022 British television series endings
1990s British game shows
2000s British game shows
2020s British game shows
British television series revived after cancellation
Channel 4 game shows
Channel 5 (British TV channel) original programming
English-language television shows
Television series by ITV Studios
Watercolor painting